Ujukatā (Pali) is a Buddhist term translated as  "rectitude", and it is the basis for the following pair of mental factors within the Theravada Abhidharma teachings:
 Kāya-ujukatā – rectitude of mental body
 Citta-ujukatā – rectitude of consciousness

These two mental factors have the characteristic of uprightness of the mental body and consciousness, respectively.

Definition 
Bhikkhu Bodhi states:
Rectitude is straightness. The twofold rectitude has the characteristic of uprightness of the mental body and consciousness, respectively. Its function is to crush tortuousness of the mental body and consciousness, and its manifestation is non-crookedness. Its proximate cause is the mental body and consciousness. It should be regarded as opposed to hypocrisy and fraudulence, etc., which create crookedness in the mental body and consciousness.

Nina van Gorkom explains:
According to the Dhammasangani (par 50, 51) this pair of cetasikas consists in straightness and rectitude, being without deflection, twist or crookedness.
The Atthasālinī (I, Book I, Part IV, Chapter I, 131) explains that uprightness of cetasikas and of citta crush crookedness and that they are the opponents of the corruptions, such as deception and craftiness, which cause crookedness in mental factors and consciousness.
Uprightness is the opponent of deception and craftiness.

See also 
 Mental factors (Buddhism)
 Samadhi (Buddhism)

References

Sources 
 
 

Buddhist meditation
Wholesome factors in Buddhism
Pali words and phrases